West Albany is the name of several communities in the United States. The name may refer to:

Minnesota
 West Albany, Minnesota, an unincorporated community in southeast Minnesota
 West Albany Township, Wabasha County, Minnesota, a township in southeast Minnesota

New York
 West Albany, New York, a hamlet of Colonie, in Albany County, New York
 West Albany Yard, a rail yard in the hamlet of West Albany, town of Colonie and the city of Albany, New York

Oregon
 West Albany High School, one of two high schools in the Greater Albany Public School District of Albany, Oregon